Birgit Beyer (born 13 December 1967 in Ulm) is a German former field hockey player who competed in the 1996 Summer Olympics and in the 2000 Summer Olympics.

References

External links
 

1967 births
Living people
German female field hockey players
Female field hockey goalkeepers
Olympic field hockey players of Germany
Field hockey players at the 1996 Summer Olympics
Field hockey players at the 2000 Summer Olympics
Sportspeople from Ulm